Errol Parish Church is a listed church in the Scottish village of Errol, Perth and Kinross. It has the informal names of North Church and the Cathedral of the Carse.

History
The Parish of Errol has some of the oldest records in Scotland. A church in the locality is recorded in the early 13th Century. Little is known of the characteristics of the Medieval building. It was demolished and rebuilt in 1765, although a sketch produced during its early life shows a large traceried window built into a small annex on one of its walls, suggesting the reuse of at least some of the old materials. In the  early 19th Century, it was decided that the church again needed to be rebuilt. A site was donated in 1830 by John Lee Allen of Errol Park. The donated ground was 120 metres to the NNE of the former location. The church was designed by James Gillespie Graham and was officially opened on 17 March 1833. The builder of the church, one George Page, charged only £3819 for his services, a very low sum, and subsequently went bankrupt as a result. The church's predecessor was later demolished, although its graveyard still exists.

The church's clock was installed in 1902 in memory of Reverend Robert Graham, who served as the church's minister for 42 years. The church's bells were restored at the same time. The organ and communion table were provided by another bequest in 1905, and in 1915–16, Lady Ogilvie Dalgleish paid for new flooring, the installation of heating and gas lighting, a pulpit and chairs for the priests and elders. Electricity was installed in 1934 at the expense of Mr William Watson of Scone. The silver font dates from 1778 and was removed from the 1765 church. The church has been a category A listed building since 1971, its boundary walls and gatepiers being included in the citation.

In July 2017, objections were made concerning the church's bells, which an anonymous complainant claimed were too loud. On the village's social media page, over 400 people posted their support for the continued striking of the bells, and the complaint was later withdrawn.

Organisation
The church is in the Presbytery of Perth. Since , the church has been linked with Kilspindie & Rait Parish Church.

References

Churches completed in 1833
Church of Scotland churches
Listed churches in Scotland
Churches in Perth and Kinross
Category A listed buildings in Perth and Kinross